Bangarupalyam mandal is one of the 66 mandals in the Chittoor district of the Indian state of Andhra Pradesh. Its headquarters are located at Bangarupalyam. The mandal borders Tamil Nadu and is bounded by Palamaner, Gangavaram, Thavanampalle and Yadamari mandals of Chittoor district.

Towns and villages 

 census, the mandal has 29 villages.

The settlements in the mandal are listed below:

See also 
List of mandals in Andhra Pradesh

References 

Mandals in Chittoor district